Keravnos:

Keravnos B.C., Cyprus basketball club.
Keravnos B.C. (women), Cyprus women's basketball club.
Greek destroyer Keravnos, Greek destroyer.